El Lazarillo de Tormes is a 1959 Spanish-Italian film directed by César Fernández Ardavín. An adaptation of the anonymous sixteenth century novel Lazarillo de Tormes (1554), it tells the story of Lazarillo, a poor boy who has to live by his wits after being sold to a series of cruel masters.

Plot 
The film focuses on the childhood of Lazarillo (Marco Paoletti), a young man from a very humble family who is entrusted by his mother to a blind man (Carlos Casaravilla) to serve as his apprentice.

Cast
 Marco Paoletti - Lazarillo
 Juan José Menéndez - The Squire
 Carlos Casaravilla - Ciego (Blind Man)
 Memmo Carotenuto - Cómico (The Actor)
 Antonio Molino Rojo - Alguacil (Bailiff)
 Margarita Lozano - Antona
 Emilio Santiago - Sacristán de la Sagra
 Pilar Sanclemente - Ciega (Blind Girl)
 Mary Paz Pondal - Moza 1ª (Girl #1)
 Ana Rivero - Moza 2ª (Girl #2)
 Juana Cáceres - Mujer sacristán
 Luis Roses - Tejero
 Victoria Rambla - Viuda (Widow)
 Carmen Rodríguez - Hilandera vieja
 Ángeles Macua - Hilandera joven

Awards
Won
 Berlin Film Festival: Golden Bear
Premios CEC: Best Film and Best Director

See also 
The Rogues (1987)

References

External links

1959 films
1959 comedy-drama films
1950s Spanish-language films
Spain in fiction
Films based on Spanish novels
Golden Bear winners
Films directed by César Fernández Ardavín
Films set in the 16th century
Spanish comedy-drama films
Italian comedy-drama films
1950s Spanish films
1950s Italian films